The 1980–81 Romanian Hockey League season was the 51st season of the Romanian Hockey League. Six teams participated in the league, and Dinamo Bucuresti won the championship.

Regular season

External links
hochei.net

Romania
Romanian Hockey League seasons
Rom